Vibrio virus nt1 (formerly Vibrio phage nt-1) is a bacteriophage known to infect Vibrio bacteria. It infects Vibrio natriegens and was originally isolated from a coastal marsh, a frequent habitat of V. natriegens.

References

Myoviridae